Dame Helen Frances Ghosh, DCB (Kirkby; born 21 February 1956) is a former British civil servant who has been Master of Balliol College, Oxford since 2018. She was previously Director-General of the National Trust for Places of Historic Interest or Natural Beauty from November 2012 to April 2018.

From 1979 to 2012 she was a British civil servant. She was Permanent Secretary at the Home Office from January 2011 to November 2012, and prior to that was Permanent Secretary at the Department for Environment, Food and Rural Affairs (DEFRA) from November 2005 to the end of 2010. On appointment at DEFRA, she was the only female permanent secretary to head a major department of the British Government.

Early life and education
Ghosh was born Helen Frances Kirkby in Farnborough, Hampshire, in 1956, daughter of William Kirkby, a civil service scientist, and his wife, Eileen (née Howe), a librarian. She was educated at Farnborough Hill, an all-girls private Catholic school.

She studied modern history at St Hugh's College, Oxford, graduating with a Bachelor of Arts (BA) degree in 1976. She then undertook postgraduate study at Hertford College, Oxford, graduating with a Master of Letters (MLitt) in 1980; her thesis concerned the history of Italy in the 6th century.

Career
Ghosh joined the Department of the Environment in 1979 as an administration trainee. From 1981 to 1983 she was assistant private secretary to Michael Heseltine, the Secretary of State for the Environment. She was private secretary to the Minister for Environment and Housing from 1986 to 1988, and was head of the Housing Policy and Home Ownership Team from 1992 to 1995.

In July 1995 she joined the Cabinet Office on loan, as deputy director of the Efficiency Unit. She left the post in May 1997 to become director of the London East and European Programmes at the Government Office for London.

Between May 1999 and November 1999, she was head of the New Deal for Communities Programme at the Department of the Environment, Transport and the Regions. She then joined the Department for Work and Pensions as director of the Children's Group.

She rejoined the Cabinet Office in October 2001, as head of Central Secretariat, and, in 2003, became director general for Corporate Services at HM Revenue & Customs (HMRC), where she played an important part in the transformation programme merging the Inland Revenue and Customs & Excise to form the new department. She was appointed permanent secretary at the Department for Environment, Food and Rural Affairs (Defra) in November 2005. She replaced David Normington as permanent secretary at the Home Office in January 2011.

In November 2012, she stepped down from her role at the Home Office to become director general at the National Trust. In April 2018, Ghosh left that role to become Master of Balliol College, Oxford, succeeding Drummond Bone.

Board memberships
Ghosh was a board member of the National School for Government, and a committee member and former chair of the Blackfriars Overseas Aid Trust, based in Oxford. She was elected a Rhodes Trustee in 2011.

Honours
She was appointed Dame Commander of the Order of the Bath (DCB) in the Queen's Birthday Honours list in June 2008. In 2010, The Tablet named her as one of Britain's most influential Roman Catholics.

Personal life
In 1979, she married Peter Ghosh, an associate professor of Modern History at Oxford, who has, since 1982, been Jean Duffield Fellow and Tutor in Modern History at St Anne's College, Oxford. They have a son, William, and a daughter, Olivia.

References

1956 births
Living people
Alumni of Hertford College, Oxford
Alumni of St Hugh's College, Oxford
British civil servants
British Roman Catholics
Dames Commander of the Order of the Bath
Civil servants in the Department of the Environment
Civil servants in the Cabinet Office
Civil servants in the Department for the Environment, Transport and the Regions
Civil servants in the Department for Work and Pensions
Fellows of St Hugh's College, Oxford
People from Farnborough, Hampshire
Permanent Under-Secretaries of State for the Home Department
Permanent Under-Secretaries of State for Environment, Food and Rural Affairs
Private secretaries in the British Civil Service
People educated at Farnborough Hill
National Trust people
Rhodes Trustees